"I'm Not Supposed to Love You Anymore" is a song written by Skip Ewing and Donny Kees, and recorded by American country music singer Bryan White.  It was released in February 1996 as the first single from his album Between Now and Forever.  The song peaked at number 4 on the U.S. country chart and at number 2 on the Canadian country chart. It also peaked at number 1 on the Bubbling Under Hot 100 chart.

Music video
The music video was directed by Jeffrey C. Phillips and premiered in early 1996.

Chart performance
"I'm Not Supposed to Love You Anymore" debuted at number 61 on the U.S. Billboard Hot Country Singles & Tracks for the chart week of March 2, 1996.

Year-end charts

References

1996 songs
Bryan White songs
1996 singles
Songs written by Skip Ewing
Song recordings produced by Kyle Lehning
Song recordings produced by Billy Joe Walker Jr.
Asylum Records singles
Songs written by Donny Kees